Eric M. Patashnik is an American political scientist, author, professor of public policy and political science at the Watson Institute for International and Public Affairs and Department of Political Science at Brown University.

Early life and education

Patashnik graduated with a B.A. in history and economics from University of Virginia in 1987 and obtained an MPP from the Goldman School of Public Policy at University of California, Berkeley in 1989 and a Ph.D. in political science from University of California, Berkeley in 1996.

Career

Patashnik served as a legislative analyst for the U.S. House of Representatives Subcommittee on Elections during 1989–91. He was a Research Fellow at the Brookings Institution in 1995–96. He held faculty positions at Yale University from 1996 to 2000, at UCLA from 2000 to 2002, and at the University of Virginia from 2002 to 2016. During his time at University of Virginia, he served as associate dean of the Frank Batten School of Leadership and Public Policy. Patashnik has published articles for various newspapers and popular outlets. In 2009 he discussed healthcare policy on C-Span. In 1999 he wrote about the fiscalization of public policy debate. An opinion piece in The New York Times described him as a leading scholar of why policies succeed or fail.

Patashnik is a Nonresident Senior Fellow of the Brookings Institution and a Fellow of the National Academy of Public Administration. He served as editor of the Journal of Health Politics, Policy and Law from 2016 to 2019. He was president of the Public Policy Section of the American Political Science Association during 2017–18.

Awards 

 In 2009, Patashnik received the Louis Brownlow Book Award from the National Academy of Public Administration for the best book on public administration published in 2008. 
 In 2010, Patashnik received a best paper award (together with Julian E. Zelizer) from the Public Policy Section of the American Political Science Association.
 In 2018, Patashnik received the Louis Brownlow Book Award from the National Academy of Public Administration for the best book on public administration published in 2017.
 In 2018, Patashnik received the Don K. Price Award (together with Alan S. Gerber and Conor M. Dowling) from the Science, Technology, and Environmental Politics Section of the American Political Science Association.

Bibliography
Reforms at Risk:  What Happens After Major Policy Changes are Enacted (2008)
Unhealthy Politics: The Battle over Evidence-Based Medicine (together with Alan S. Gerber and Conor M. Dowling), 2017.
A Practical Guide for Policy Analysis: The Eightfold Path to More Effective Problem Solving, Sixth Edition (together with Eugene S. Bardach), 2019.
“The Struggle to Remake Politics: Liberal Reform and the Limits of Policy Feedback in the Contemporary American State, Perspectives in Politics (together with Julian E. Zelizer), 2013.
Putting Trust in the U.S. Budget: Federal Trust Funds and the Politics of Commitment, 2000.
"In Praise of Pork", co-author (1993)

References

External links
 

University of California, Berkeley alumni
American political scientists
Brown University faculty
Year of birth missing (living people)
Living people